Arctia tancrei is a moth of the  family Erebidae. It was described by Staudinger in 1887. It is found in Kazakhstan, Uzbekistan, Tajikistan, Kyrghyzstan and China.

This species, along with the others of the genus Oroncus, was moved to Arctia as a result of phylogenetic research published by Rönkä et al. in 2016.

Subspecies
Arctia tancrei tancrei (Kyrghyzstan: Inner and Central Tien Shan; China: Xinjiang)
Arctia tancrei alaica O.Bang-Haas, 1927 (Uzbekistan and Tajikistan: Turkestan mountain range; Kyrghyzstan: Alai; Trans-Alai: Zaalaiskii Mountains; Tajikistan: Pamir Mountains)
Arctia tancrei fasciata O.Bang-Haas, 1927 (eastern Kazakhstan: Dzhungarian Alatau Mountains)

References

Spilosomina
Moths described in 1887
Moths of Asia